Moung is a khum (commune) of Moung Ruessei District in Battambang Province in north-western Cambodia.

Villages

 Paen
 Ou Krabau
 Kaoh Char
 Ruessei Muoy
 Roluos
 Ruessei Pir
 Kansai Banteay
 Ra
 Daeum Doung
 Moung
 Pralay
 Ta Tok Muoy
 Ta Tok Pir

References

Communes of Battambang province
Moung Ruessei District